Michael Dugan, Mike or Mickey Dugan may refer to:
 Michael Dugan (general) (born 1937), Chief of Staff of United States Air Force
 Michael Dugan (poet) (1947–2006), Australian poet
 Michael T. Dugan (born 1957), accounting academic
 Mike Dugan (politician) (born 1956), American politician in Georgia
 Mickey Dugan, see The Yellow Kid
 Michael Dugan, fictional President of the United States in the video game Command & Conquer: Red Alert 2
 Mike Dugan, a character in the DC streaming series ''Stargirl''

See also
 Mike Duggan (born 1958), American businessman and politician in Michigan
 Michael Duggan, American TV show producer